Sayyida Aisha Mosque (مسجد السيدة عائشة رضي الله عنها) is a mosque in Cairo, Egypt

See also
 Lists of mosques
 List of mosques in Africa
 List of mosques in Egypt

External links

 Government Website of Islamic artifacts

14th-century mosques
14th-century establishments in Egypt
Mosque buildings with domes
Mausoleums in Egypt
Mosques in Cairo